Eitan Tibi (or Eytan, ; born 16 November 1987) is an Israeli footballer who plays as a centre-back for Hapoel Be'er Sheva.

Early life
Tibi was born in Jerusalem, Israel, to a Sephardic Jewish family.

Career
Tibi started his career in the youth teams of Beitar Haifa and Maccabi Netanya. In 2006–07 he signed for Beitar Jerusalem for four years at the age of 19. On his senior year with the club he could not break into the first team and in 2007–08 he was loaned to Hapoel Ra'anana. In 2008–09 he was loaned again to HaKoach Ramat Gan.

In 2009–10 Tibi returned to Beitar Jerusalem and played 21 league games with the club, before signing a two-years contract with the Belgian side Charleroi. After just 9 games with the club and his inability to find a place in the starting lineup, he decided to return to Israel.

In January 2011 Tibi signed a three-and-a-half years contract with Ironi Kiryat Shmona. In 2011–12 he was a key part in the historic championship title win of Ironi Kiryat Shmona, together with the Toto Cup Al win. At the end of that season he made his debut for the Israeli national football team against Czech Republic.

Maccabi Tel Aviv
On 29 August 2012, Tibi signed a three-year contract with Maccabi Tel Aviv, after long negotiations with Ironi Kiryat Shmona owner Izi Sheratzky about the release-clause in his contract. With arbitration advice, it appeared the €300,000 release-clause was valid and Tibi was allowed to join Maccabi. He made his debut for the club on 3 September 2012, in the first gameweek of the season, against Maccabi Netanya. His remarkable form in 2012–13 made Tibi a vital part in the middle of defense for Maccabi, together with Carlos García, and he was lined-up 34 times in the league. He scored his first goal for Maccabi on 2 March 2013 in an away match against Bnei Sakhnin. In that season he won his second consecutive championship title and his first one with Maccabi Tel Aviv. On 17 July 2013, he made his first appearance in a European match, in the second qualifying round of the UEFA Champions League against Győri ETO FC. Maccabi eventually qualified to the Europa League.

Tibi started 2013–14 season extremely well, leading the club to a new Israeli Premier League record, after Maccabi Tel Aviv conceded its first goal of the season only in the 45th minute of the 7th gameweek. The previous record was held by Hapoel Haifa F.C. in 1998–99. He won the 2013–14 season's championship with Maccabi. In 2014–15, he won with Maccabi the third consecutive championship, this season he also won the State Cup and Toto Cup.

In 2015–16, he qualified with Maccabi to the UEFA Champions League group stage. In the 2015–16 season in the Israeli Premier League, Tibi lost with Maccabi the championship to Hapoel Be'er Sheva He signed a contract extension with Maccabi for three years in the end of the season.

Hapoel Be'er Sheva
On 28 June 2021, Tibi signed for 2 years at Hapoel Be'er Sheva.

International career
In 2012 Tibi made his debut for the national team in a friendly match against Czech Republic. His form at his club, Maccabi Tel Aviv, has made him a first-team regular, playing steadily for the national team under the lead of Eli Guttman and maintaining good performances.

Career statistics

Club
As of 1 June 2022.

National team

As of 11 September 2018.

International goals
Scores and results list Israel's goal tally first.

Honours

 Beitar Jerusalem
 Premier League (1): 2006–07

 Ironi Kiryat Shmona
 Premier League (1): 2011–12
 Toto Cup (1): 2011–12

 Maccabi Tel Aviv
 Premier League (5): 2012–13, 2013–14, 2014–15, 2018–19, 2019-20
 State Cup (2): 2014–15, 2020–21
 Toto Cup (4): 2014–15, 2017–18, 2018–19, 2020-21
 Super Cup (2): 2019, 2020

Hapoel Be'er Sheva
State Cup (1): 2021–22
Super Cup: 2022

References

External links
 
 Profile on One.co.il 

1987 births
Living people
Israeli Sephardi Jews
Israeli footballers
Israel international footballers
Association football defenders
Beitar Jerusalem F.C. players
Hapoel Ra'anana A.F.C. players
Hakoah Maccabi Amidar Ramat Gan F.C. players
R. Charleroi S.C. players
Hapoel Ironi Kiryat Shmona F.C. players
Maccabi Tel Aviv F.C. players
Hapoel Be'er Sheva F.C. players
Israeli Premier League players
Liga Leumit players
Belgian Pro League players
Israeli expatriate footballers
Expatriate footballers in Belgium
Israeli expatriate sportspeople in Belgium
Israeli people of Moroccan-Jewish descent
Footballers from Jerusalem